Roeland "Roel" Nusse (born 9 June 1950, Amsterdam) is a professor at Stanford University and an investigator at the Howard Hughes Medical Institute. His research was seminal in the discovery of Wnt signaling, a family of pleiotropic regulators involved in development and disease.

Research
Nusse received his BSc in biology and his PhD from the University of Amsterdam. Nusse did a postdoctoral fellowship under the guidance of Harold Varmus at the University of California, San Francisco.  In 1982, Nusse and Varmus discovered the Wnt1 gene.

After his postdoctoral fellowship, Nusse joined the Netherlands Cancer Institute expanding on the earlier work on the Wnt pathway and identifying the pathway in fruit flies. In 1990, he joined the department of Developmental Biology at Stanford University. His lab is currently focused on the role of Wnt in stem cell development and tissue repair.

Awards
Nusse received the Peter Debye Prize from the University of Maastricht in 2000.  He is a member of the U.S. National Academy of Sciences, European Molecular Biology Organization, and the Royal Netherlands Academy of Arts and Sciences (since 1997). He is  a fellow of the American Academy of Arts and Sciences. He won a Breakthrough Prize in 2017. In 2020 he received the Canada Gairdner International Award.

References

External links
 Roeland Nusse Lab at Stanford University

1950 births
Living people
Developmental biologists
Dutch biologists
Howard Hughes Medical Investigators
Members of the Royal Netherlands Academy of Arts and Sciences
Members of the United States National Academy of Sciences
Dutch molecular biologists
Scientists from Amsterdam
Stanford University School of Medicine faculty
University of Amsterdam alumni
Academic staff of the University of Amsterdam
University of California, San Francisco alumni